Fumage is a surrealist art technique popularized by Wolfgang Paalen in which impressions are made by the smoke of a candle or kerosene lamp on a piece of paper or canvas. Paalen's first Fumage Dictated by a Candle was presented 1936 in the International Surrealist Exhibition in London. In the same year Paalen painted his first oil based on the fumage, "Pays interdit" ("Forbidden Land"). Several other Surrealists as Roberto Matta, but also Salvador Dalí later utilized the technique, Dali calling the technique "sfumato". The technique has been utilized by artists including Bimal Banerjee, Adam Blakemore, Alberto Burri, Burhan Doğançay, Jiri Georg Dokoupil, Hugh Parker Guiler, Yves Klein, Antonio Muñiz, and Otto Piene.

In popular media
Guiler's usage of the fumage technique is depicted briefly in the 1987 film Henry and June and his fumage pictures were often used as the covers for his wife Anaïs Nin's books.

Scholarship
Scholar Mary Flanagan compared the technique to the reading of tea leaves and to the Rorschach test. José Antonio Pérez Esteban's 2013 doctoral thesis analyzes fumage art, especially "soot paintings" by Jiri Georg Dokoupil.
(Link Thesis)

See also
 Surrealist techniques
 Pyrography

References

External links

Video demo of how the fumage technique works by Antonio Muñiz

Visual arts media
Smoke
Surrealist techniques